Jon McGregor (born 1976) is a British novelist and short story writer. In 2002, his first novel was longlisted for the Booker Prize, making him then the youngest ever contender. His second and fourth novels were longlisted for the Booker Prize in 2006 and 2017 respectively. In 2012, his third novel, Even the Dogs, was awarded the International Dublin Literary Award. The New York Times has labelled him a "wicked British writer".

Early life
Born in Bermuda, McGregor was raised in the UK. He grew up in Norwich and Thetford, Norfolk. He attended City College Norwich sixth form and then studied for a degree in Media Technology and Production at Bradford University. In his final year there he contributed a series entitled "Cinema 100" to the anthology Five Uneasy Pieces (Pulp Faction).

Career
Having moved to Nottingham (where he now lives), he wrote his first novel, If Nobody Speaks of Remarkable Things, while living on a narrowboat. It was nominated for the 2002 Booker Prize, making its author the youngest contender and only first novelist on the longlist. McGregor was only 26 at the time.

If Nobody Speaks of Remarkable Things went on to win the Betty Trask Prize and the Somerset Maugham Award, among other honours. His novel So Many Ways to Begin, published in 2006, also found its way onto the Booker Prize longlist. McGregor was commissioned to write a short story, which was called "Close", for the Cheltenham Literature Festival in 2007. McGregor has had short fiction published by several magazines, including Granta magazine. His first collection of short stories is entitled This Isn't the Sort of Thing That Happens to Someone Like You (2012). His influences include Alice Munro, Douglas Coupland, Raymond Carver, Richard Brautigan and Charles Simic.

In 2010, McGregor received an honorary doctorate from the University of Nottingham, and was made an honorary lecturer in their School of English Studies. He is currently a writer-in-residence for the charity First Story. On 13 June 2012, McGregor was awarded the International Dublin Literary Award for his third novel Even the Dogs, with Lord Mayor Andrew Montague announcing the winner at the Mansion House, Dublin. The book was nominated for the award by Rudomino State Library for Foreign Literature in Moscow.

The International Dublin Literary Award was a competition among 147 writers nominated by international public libraries, including Pulitzer Prize winner Jennifer Egan. McGregor received a prize of €100,000. The prize's judging panel, which included the British novelist Tim Parks and the Trinidadian writer Elizabeth Nunez, described Even the Dogs, a novel detailing the highs and lows of drug addiction, as a "fearless experiment". McGregor described it as "a real honour to have been selected from such a huge list of fantastic works from around the world." He was the first British writer to win the award since Nicola Barker in 2000.

Works

Novels
 If Nobody Speaks of Remarkable Things (Bloomsbury, 2002)
 So Many Ways to Begin (Bloomsbury, 2006)
 Even the Dogs (Bloomsbury, 2010)
 Reservoir 13 (HarperCollins, 2017)
 Lean Fall Stand (HarperCollins, 2021)

Short story collections
 This Isn't the Sort of Thing That Happens to Someone Like You (Bloomsbury, 2012)
 The Reservoir Tapes (2017)
 "we wave and call"(2012)

Awards and honours
 2002 Sunday Times Young Writer of the Year Award, If Nobody Speaks of Remarkable Things
 2002 Commonwealth Writers Prize (Eurasia Region, Best First Book), shortlist, If Nobody Speaks of Remarkable Things
 2003 Booker Prize, longlist, If Nobody Speaks of Remarkable Things
 2003 Somerset Maugham Award, winner, If Nobody Speaks of Remarkable Things
 2003 British Book Awards, shortlist, If Nobody Speaks of Remarkable Things
 2003 Betty Trask Prize, winner, If Nobody Speaks of Remarkable Things
 2006 Booker Prize, longlist, So Many Ways to Begin
 2010 BBC National Short Story Competition, runner-up
 2010 University of Nottingham, honorary doctorate
 2011 BBC National Short Story Competition, runner-up
 2012 International Dublin Literary Award, winner, Even the Dogs
 2017 Costa Book Award, Novel, Reservoir 13
 2017 Goldsmiths Prize, Shortlist, Reservoir 13
 2017 Booker Prize, Longlist, Reservoir 13

References

Further reading

External links
 [Jon's Official website has been hacked (9 July 2021) so this link has been deleted]
 "My desktop" in The Guardian

1976 births
Living people
Alumni of the University of Bradford
21st-century British novelists
Bermudian novelists
Writers from Norwich
Postmodern writers
British male novelists
People from Thetford
21st-century British male writers
People educated at City College Norwich